The 2004–05 Iranian Futsal Super League will be the 2nd season of the Futsal Super League.

Play Off 
 Dabiri
 Chini Hamgam
 Post
 Shahrdari Tonekabon

League standings

Awards 

 Winner: Tam Iran Khodro
 Runners-up: Eram Kish
 Third-Place: Shensa
 Top scorer:  Vahid Shamsaei (Eram Kish) (38)

References

Futsal Planet 
Futsal News 

Iranian Futsal Super League seasons
1